Fouad "Fred" Bachirou (born 15 April 1990) is a professional footballer who plays as a midfielder for Cyprus First Division side Omonia.

He previously played for Paris Saint-Germain reserves, Greenock Morton in Scotland, Swedish sides Östersund and Malmö FF, and EFL Championship side Nottingham Forest. Born in France, he represents Comoros at international level.

Career

Paris Saint-Germain
Born in Valence, Bachirou started his career in the youth teams at local side Football Club de la Place de Clichy, before winning a move to Ligue 1 giants Paris Saint-Germain, where he played in the CFA side in the French third division – scoring once against UJA Maccabi Paris Métropole.

Greenock Morton
Bachirou transferred to Greenock Morton in July 2010, after a trial spell at the club. He made his competitive debut for Greenock Morton in a Scottish Challenge Cup match against Dumbarton on 25 July 2010. In June 2011, Bachirou signed a new one-year contract at Morton. After over 50 appearances for the club, Bachirou scored his first goal in a 2–2 draw with Queen of the South on 7 April 2012. Bachirou stated he would not be seeking a new contract with the club in May 2012. On 17 August 2012, Bachirou made a U-turn and re-signed for the club, after rejecting a move to league rivals Hamilton Accies.

In September 2013, he signed a contract extension until summer 2015.

Östersunds FK
Bachirou made a surprise move to Östersunds FK in August 2014. He made his debut from the bench away to promoted club Husqvarna FF. During his time at Östersund they managed to get a promotion to Allsvenskan, win the Swedish Cup and qualify for the 2017–18 UEFA Europa League.

Malmö FF 
On 9 January 2018, Swedish champions Malmö FF confirmed the transfer of Bachirou for an estimated fee of around 7 million SEK (roughly £600,000).

Nottingham Forest 
On 26 August 2020, Bachirou joined EFL Championship side Nottingham Forest for an undisclosed transfer fee. He made his first-team debut in a 1–0 EFL Cup defeat to Barnsley. Despite being Sabri Lamouchi's 'priority target' during the summer transfer window, Bachirou made only three appearances for Forest during the 2020–21 season. At the end of the season, Bachirou was told that he was not in Chris Hughton's plans and was free to leave the club.

Omonia FC 
On 16 August 2021, Bachirou joined Cyprus First Division side Omonia Nicosia on a free transfer. In his first season at the club, he helped Omonia win the Cypriot Cup.

International career
In February 2014, Bachirou received a call-up to the Comoros national team for their friendly against Burkina Faso. Bachirou played for 90 minutes as Comoros recorded a respectable 1–1 draw in Marseille, France.

He made his first competitive appearance, and won his second cap, in the first leg of an Africa Cup of Nations first round qualifier away to Kenya in Nairobi. Bachirou started the match but could not prevent Comoros from suffering a 1–0 defeat.

Personal life
Bachirou is a Muslim, and his parents hail from the Comoros. In 2019, he married his Scottish fiancée, Debbie.

Career statistics

Club

Honours
Östersunds FK
Svenska Cupen: 2016–17

Malmö FF
Allsvenskan: 2020

 Omonia
Cypriot Cup: 2021–22

See also
 Greenock Morton F.C. season 2010–11 | 2011–12 | 2012–13 | 2013–14
 Östersunds FK season 2016 | 2017
 Malmö FF season 2018 | 2019 | 2020

References

External links

Living people
1990 births
Sportspeople from Valence, Drôme
Footballers from Auvergne-Rhône-Alpes
French sportspeople of Comorian descent
Citizens of Comoros through descent
French footballers
Comorian footballers
Association football midfielders
Comoros international footballers
2021 Africa Cup of Nations players
Greenock Morton F.C. players
Paris Saint-Germain F.C. players
Scottish Football League players
Scottish Professional Football League players
French Muslims
Östersunds FK players
Championnat National 2 players
Superettan players
Allsvenskan players
Malmö FF players
Nottingham Forest F.C. players
French expatriate footballers
French expatriate sportspeople in Scotland
Expatriate footballers in Scotland
French expatriate sportspeople in Sweden
Expatriate footballers in Sweden
Comorian expatriate sportspeople in England
French expatriate sportspeople in England
Expatriate footballers in England
Comorian expatriate sportspeople in Scotland
Comorian expatriate sportspeople in Sweden
Comorian expatriate sportspeople in Cyprus
Comorian expatriate footballers